Son İstasyon is a 2010 Turkish drama film written and directed by Oğulcan Kırca and starring the director's father Levent Kırca.

Production
The film was shot on location in Istanbul and Uşak, Turkey.

See also 
 2010 in film
 Turkish films of 2010

References

External links
 Son İstasyon official website (Turkish)
 

2010 films
2010 drama films
Films set in Turkey
Turkish drama films
2010s Turkish-language films